Ganea's conjecture is a now disproved claim in algebraic topology.  It states that
 
for all , where   is the Lusternik–Schnirelmann category of a topological space X, and Sn is the n-dimensional sphere. 

The inequality 
 
Furthermore, for any sphere , .

The conjecture was formulated by Tudor Ganea in 1971.  Many particular cases of this conjecture were proved, and Norio Iwase gave a counterexample to the general case in 1998. In a follow-up paper from 2002, Iwase gave an even stronger counterexample, with X a closed smooth manifold. This counterexample also disproved a related conjecture, which stated that 
 

A minimum dimensional counterexample to the conjecture was constructed by Don Stanley and Hugo Rodríguez Ordóñez in 2010.

This work raises the question: For which spaces X is the Ganea condition, satisfied?  It has been conjectured that these are precisely the spaces X for which  equals a related invariant,

References

Disproved conjectures
Algebraic topology